The 2022–23 Scottish Premiership (known as the cinch Premiership for sponsorship reasons) is the tenth season of the Scottish Premiership, the highest division of Scottish football, and the 126th edition overall of the top national league competition, not including one cancelled due to World War II. Celtic are the defending champions. The season began on 30 July 2022.

Twelve teams contest the league: Aberdeen, Celtic, Dundee United, Heart of Midlothian, Hibernian, Kilmarnock, Livingston, Motherwell, Rangers, Ross County, St Johnstone and St Mirren.

Teams

The following teams changed division after the 2021–22 season.

Promoted from the Championship
 Kilmarnock

Relegated to the Championship
 Dundee

Stadia and locations

Personnel and kits

Managerial changes

Format
In the initial phase of the season, the 12 teams will play a round-robin tournament whereby each team plays each one of the other teams three times. After 33 games, the league splits into two sections of six teams, with each team playing each other in that section. The league attempts to balance the fixture list so that teams in the same section play each other twice at home and twice away, but sometimes this is impossible. A total of 228 matches will be played, with 38 matches played by each team.

League summary

League table

Results

Matches 1–22
Teams play each other twice, once at home and once away.

Matches 23–33
Teams play each other once, either home or away.

Matches 34–38
After 33 matches, the league splits into two sections of six teams i.e. the top six and the bottom six, with the teams playing every other team in their section once (either at home or away). The exact matches are determined by the position of the teams in the league table at the time of the split.

Season statistics

Scoring

Top scorers

Hat-tricks

Most assists

Source:

Clean sheets

Source:

Attendances
These are the average attendances of the teams.

Awards

References

External links
Official website

Scottish Premiership seasons
1
1
Scot
Scottish Premiership